The 2020 Paris–Roubaix Femmes was a one-day road cycling race scheduled to take place on 25 October 2020, on the same day as the postponed men's race, which had been rescheduled from its traditional date in April due to the COVID-19 pandemic. However, on 9 October 2020, the race was cancelled due to an increase of coronavirus cases in France. The race would have been the first women's edition of Paris–Roubaix. The first edition of Paris–Roubaix Femmes subsequently took place in 2021.

Route 
The inaugural women's edition of Paris–Roubaix would have started in Denain and finished on the velodrome in Roubaix covering . It would have featured  of cobblestones, spread out over 17 sectors.

Teams
Eight UCI Women's WorldTeams and fifteen UCI Women's Continental Teams were due to make up the twenty-three competing teams.

UCI Women's WorldTeams

 
 
 
 
 
 
 
 

UCI Women's Continental Teams

See also 
 2020 in women's road cycling

References

External links
 

2020
Tour
2020 UCI Women's World Tour
Paris–Roubaix (women's race)